Drexel Development Historic District is a national historic district located in the University City neighborhood of Philadelphia, Pennsylvania. It encompasses 96 contributing rowhouses dated to the mid- to late-19th century.  A number of the rowhouses were designed by architect Samuel Sloan.  The architectural firm G. W. & W. D. Hewitt designed rowhouses for developer Anthony Joseph Drexel on the block bounded by Pine, new 39th, Baltimore, and 40th Streets.  They are representative of a number of popular architectural styles including Second Empire, Italianate, and High Victorian.

It was added to the National Register of Historic Places in 1982.

References

Historic districts in Philadelphia
Houses on the National Register of Historic Places in Philadelphia
Italianate architecture in Pennsylvania
Second Empire architecture in Pennsylvania
University City, Philadelphia
Historic districts on the National Register of Historic Places in Pennsylvania